This article is about the particular significance of the year 1972 to Wales and its people.

Incumbents

Secretary of State for Wales – Peter Thomas
Archbishop of Wales – Gwilym Williams, Bishop of Bangor
Archdruid of the National Eisteddfod of Wales
Tilsli (outgoing)
Brinli (incoming)

Events
1 January – Welsh rugby captain John Dawes is made an OBE in the New Year Honours List.
30 January – Opening to rail traffic of the new Britannia Bridge linking Anglesey with mainland Wales (following the destruction of the previous bridge by a fire).
March/April – The "Miners' Tramway" underground at Llechwedd Slate Caverns, Blaenau Ffestiniog, opens to the public.
3 May – Leslie Harvey, guitarist of Stone the Crows, is fatally electrocuted while performing at Swansea's Top Rank Suite.
13 September – Hypermarkets make their debut in the United Kingdom some twenty years after debuting in France, when French retail giant Carrefour opens a hypermarket in Caerphilly.
26 October – Passage of the Local Government Act 1972, which will reorganise and simplify local government in Wales and Monmouthshire from 1974.
11 December – Rhoose Airport is opened by The Duke of Edinburgh.
date unknown
Sir Morien Morgan becomes Master of Downing College, Cambridge.
The island of Flat Holm is designated a Site of Special Scientific Interest (SSSI).
The communities of Machynys and Bwlch y Gwynt cease to exist, following the closedown of local industry; the residents are moved into Llanelli.
Llyn Brianne regulating reservoir on the River Towy is completed; its dam is the UK's tallest, standing at a height of 300 ft (91 m).

Arts and literature
Writer James Morris becomes Jan Morris.

Awards
National Eisteddfod of Wales (held in Haverfordwest)
National Eisteddfod of Wales: Chair – Dafydd Owen, "Preselau"
National Eisteddfod of Wales: Crown – Dafydd Rowlands, "Dadeni"
National Eisteddfod of Wales: Prose Medal – Dafydd Rowlands, "Ysgrifau yr Hanner Bardd"
National Eisteddfod of Wales: Drama Medal – Urien Wiliam

New books

English language
Alexander Cordell – The Fire People
A. H. Dodd – Life in Wales
Emyr Humphreys – National Winner
Richard Jones  The Tower is Everywhere
Roland Mathias – Absalom in the Tree
Edith Pargeter – A Bloody Field By Shrewsbury
Will Paynter – My Generation (autobiography)
Goronwy Rees – A Chapter of Accidents
Ifor Williams – The beginnings of Welsh poetry

Welsh language
Marion Eames – Y Rhandir Mwyn
Islwyn Ffowc Elis – Eira Mawr
Bobi Jones – Allor Wydn
David Tecwyn Lloyd – Lady Gwladys a Phobl Eraill
Gerallt Lloyd Owen – Cerddi'r Cywilydd
Kate Roberts – Gobaith a Storïau Eraill

Drama
Gwyn Thomas – Amser Dyn sef Darnau o Einioes

Music
Badfinger – Straight Up (album)
John Cale – The Academy in Peril (album)
Dafydd Iwan – Yma Mae 'Nghân (album)
Mary Hopkin – Live At The Royal Festival Hall (album)
Tom Jones – Close Up (album)

Film
The film of Dylan Thomas's Under Milk Wood appears, with Richard Burton, Glynis Johns, Ryan Davies and many other Welsh stars.
Hywel Bennett stars with Hayley Mills in Endless Night.

Welsh-language films
The Song We Sing Is About Freedom

Broadcasting

Welsh-language television
Gwrando ar fy Nghan with singer Heather Jones
Teliffant with Myfanwy Talog

English-language television
Kenneth Griffith's reputation is underlined with a four-part documentary series about the Boer War, Sons of the Blood.
Anthony Hopkins wins acclaim for his first starring role on television in BBC2's adaptation of War and Peace.
Glyn Houston appears as Bunter opposite Ian Carmichael as Lord Peter Wimsey, in the first of several TV serials based on the stories of Dorothy L. Sayers.

Sport
Chess – Wales competes in the World Chess Olympiad at Skopje, Yugoslavia.
Cricket – Tony Lewis captains England on his Test debut in Delhi, India.
Rugby union
25 March – Derek Quinnell makes his debut for Wales against France.
31 October – Llanelli RFC defeat the New Zealand All Blacks 9–3 at Stradey Park in front of 26,000 supporters.
The Welsh Sports Association is established.
BBC Wales Sports Personality of the Year – Richard Meade

Births
27 January
Nathan Blake, footballer
Wynne Evans, tenor
March - Helen Raynor, dramatist and screenwriter
23 March – Joe Calzaghe, boxer
10 April – Chris Corcoran, comedian
7 June – Sian Lloyd, television news presenter
5 July – Nia Roberts, actress
20 August – Scott Quinnell, rugby player
24 August – Jason Bowen, footballer
4 September – Guto Pryce, musician
23 September – Julian Winn, cyclist
3 October – Josie d'Arby, actress and television presenter
4 November – Tim Vincent, television presenter
27 December – Colin Charvis, rugby player

Deaths
17 January – Stan Davies, footballer, 73
4 February – Sir Charles Robert Harington, chemist, 74
25 February – S. O. Davies, politician, 85
27 February – Will James, dual-code rugby player, 69
7 March – Jack Morley, Wales and British Lions rugby player, 62
10 March – Gwynfor Davies, cricketer, 63
20 March – Dudley Lloyd-Evans, First World War flying ace, 76 or 77
28 March – James Edward Nichols, geneticist, 69
10 April – Ormond Jones, footballer, 61
28 May – The Duke of Windsor, Prince of Wales 1910–1936), 77
14 June (at Goathurst) – Glyn Simon, Archbishop of Wales (1968–71), 69
9 July – Sir Henry Morris-Jones, doctor, soldier and politician, 87
10 July – Emrys Jones, actor, 56 (heart attack)
12 August – Reg Anderson, cricketer, 58
28 September – Tom Roberts, Wales international rugby union player, 75?
19 October
David Hughes, opera singer, 47 (heart failure)
Fred Keenor, footballer, 78
6 November – Hilary Marquand, economist and MP, 70
13 November – Glyn Prosser, dual-code rugby player, 64
30 November – Frank Evans, dual-code international rugby player, 75
4 December – Lynn Ungoed-Thomas, politician and judge, 68
unknown date 
Sam Davies, Wales international footballer, 77 or 78
Lillian Griffith, sculptor, 94 or 95

See also
1972 in Northern Ireland

References

 
Wales
 Wales